Andover High School is the name of several high schools, among them:

In the United States
 Andover High School (Kansas), Andover, Kansas
 Andover Central High School, Andover, Kansas
 Andover High School (Maryland), Linthicum, Maryland
 Andover High School (Massachusetts), Andover, Massachusetts
 North Andover High School, North Andover, Massachusetts
 Andover High School (Michigan), Bloomfield Hills, Michigan
 Andover High School (Minnesota), Andover, Minnesota